Bab Gorgi (also Romanized as Bāb Gorgī) is a village in Gevar Rural District, Sarduiyeh District, Jiroft County, Kerman Province, Iran. At the 2006 census, its population was 56, in 12 families.

References 

Populated places in Jiroft County